= Sobi Hill =

Hill in Ilorin, Kwara State, Nigeria

Coordinates: 8°32′09″N 4°33′27″E

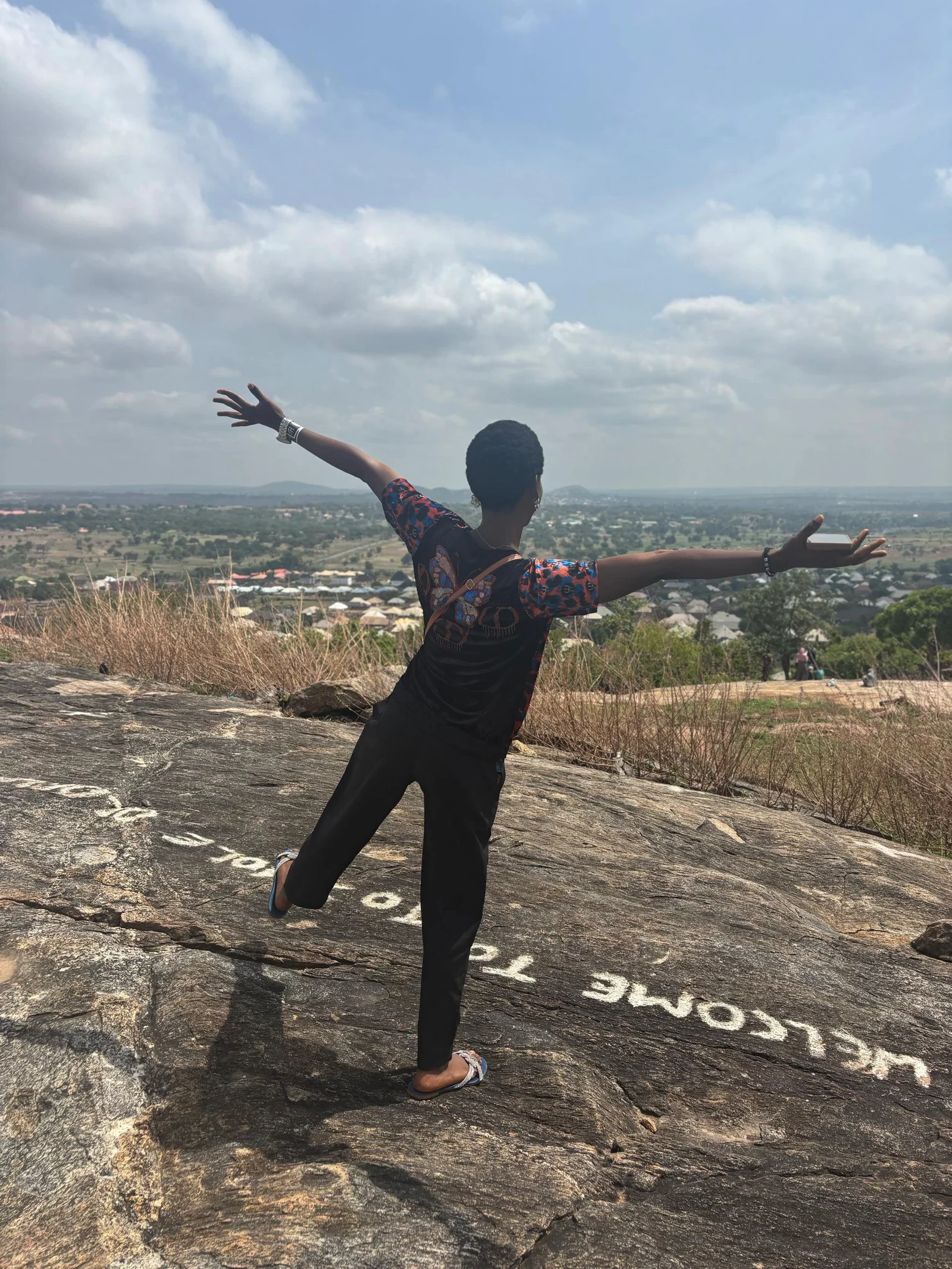
Man standing on hill

Sobi Hill is a natural landmark hill in Ilorin, Kwara State, Nigeria. Rising approximately 394 metres (1,293 ft) above sea level, it is the highest natural point in Ilorin, offering a panoramic 360-degree view of the entire city.

== History ==
During the 19th century, Sobi Hill played a strategic military role during the pre-colonial inter-tribal wars. Its elevated position served as a vital observation post for the "Baloguns" (military commanders) of the Ilorin Emirate, allowing them to monitor troop movements across the surrounding plains. The hill's rugged terrain and caves also provided a natural refuge for warriors and local inhabitants during times of conflict. Evidence of this era remains visible today in the form of "grinding holes" on the granite surfaces, where warriors reportedly prepared food and spices while stationed on the hill.

== Geography ==
Geographically, Sobi Hill is an inselberg composed of ancient granite rocks. It features two distinct conical summits connected by a saddle-like ridge. The hill rises abruptly from the surrounding plains of the Ilorin metropolis, making it a conspicuous feature of the city's skyline.

== Religious significance ==
In contemporary times, Sobi Hill is widely recognized as a center for religious tourism and spiritual pilgrimage. It is noted for being one of the few locations in Nigeria where adherents of Christianity, Islam, and traditional religions coexist peacefully for prayer and meditation.

Many Christian groups utilize the hill for prayer vigils and retreats, drawing parallels to biblical mountains. Muslims too visit the hill for mediation and solitude. Visitors are traditionally expected to remove their shoes before ascending certain sacred sections of the rock as a sign of respect.
